Alexander Hume-Campbell, 2nd Earl of Marchmont (1675–1740)
 Alexander Hume-Campbell (1708–1760)